The 1980 Wimbledon Championships was a tennis tournament that took place on the outdoor grass courts at the All England Lawn Tennis and Croquet Club in Wimbledon, London, United Kingdom. The tournament ran from 23 June until 5 July. It was the 94th staging of the Wimbledon Championships, and the second Grand Slam tennis event of 1980.

Prize money
The total prize money for 1980 championships was £293,464. The winner of the men's title earned £20,000 while the women's singles champion earned £18,000.

* per team

Champions

Seniors

Men's singles

 Björn Borg defeated  John McEnroe, 1–6, 7–5, 6–3, 6–7(16–18), 8–6
 It was Borg's 10th career Grand Slam singles title and his 5th and last title at Wimbledon.

Women's singles

 Evonne Goolagong Cawley defeated  Chris Evert Lloyd 6–1, 7–6(7–4)
 It was Cawley's 7th and last career Grand Slam singles title and her 2nd title at Wimbledon.

Men's doubles

 Peter McNamara /  Paul McNamee defeated  Bob Lutz /  Stan Smith, 7–6(7–5), 6–3, 6–7(4–7), 6–4
 It was McNamara's 2nd career Grand Slam title and his 1st Wimbledon title. It was McNamee's 2nd career Grand Slam title and his 1st Wimbledon title.

Women's doubles

 Kathy Jordan /  Anne Smith defeated  Rosie Casals /  Wendy Turnbull, 4–6, 7–5, 6–1
 It was Jordan's 2nd career Grand Slam title and her 1st Wimbledon title. It was Smith's 3rd career Grand Slam title and her 1st Wimbledon title.

Mixed doubles

 John Austin /  Tracy Austin defeated  Mark Edmondson /  Dianne Fromholtz, 4–6, 7–6 (8–6), 6–3
 It was John Austin's only career Grand Slam title. It was Tracy Austin's 2nd career Grand Slam title and her only Wimbledon title.

Juniors

Boys' singles

 Thierry Tulasne defeated  Hans-Dieter Beutel, 6–4, 3–6, 6–4

Girls' singles

 Debbie Freeman defeated  Susan Leo, 7–6, 7–5

Singles seeds

Men's singles
  Björn Borg (champion)
  John McEnroe (final, lost to Björn Borg)
  Jimmy Connors (semifinals, lost to John McEnroe)
  Vitas Gerulaitis (fourth round, lost to Wojciech Fibak)
  Roscoe Tanner (quarterfinals, lost to Jimmy Connors)
  Gene Mayer (quarterfinals, lost to Björn Borg)
  Peter Fleming (quarterfinals, lost to John McEnroe)
  Víctor Pecci (third round, lost to Phil Dent)
  Pat DuPré (third round, lost to Nick Saviano)
  Ivan Lendl (third round, lost to Colin Dibley)
  Harold Solomon (withdrew before the tournament began)
  Yannick Noah (withdrew before the tournament began)
  Wojciech Fibak (quarterfinals, lost to Brian Gottfried)
  Victor Amaya (first round, lost to Hank Pfister)
  Stan Smith (third round, lost to Brian Gottfried)
  José Luis Clerc (third round, lost to Onny Parun)

Women's singles
  Martina Navratilova (semifinals, lost to Chris Evert Lloyd)
  Tracy Austin (semifinals, lost to Evonne Goolagong Cawley)
  Chris Evert Lloyd (final, lost to Evonne Goolagong Cawley)
  Evonne Goolagong Cawley (champion)
  Billie Jean King (quarterfinals, lost to Martina Navratilova)
  Wendy Turnbull (quarterfinals, lost to Evonne Goolagong Cawley)
  Virginia Wade (fourth round, lost to Andrea Jaeger)
  Dianne Fromholtz (fourth round, lost to Greer Stevens)
  Hana Mandlíková (fourth round, lost to Evonne Goolagong Cawley)
  Kathy Jordan (fourth round, lost to Martina Navratilova)
  Greer Stevens (quarterfinals, lost to Tracy Austin)
  Virginia Ruzici (second round, lost to JoAnne Russell)
  Sue Barker (second round, lost to Betty Ann Dent)
  Andrea Jaeger (quarterfinals, lost to Chris Evert Lloyd)
  Regina Maršíková (second round, lost to Sue Saliba)
  Sylvia Hanika (second round, lost to Pam Shriver)

References

External links
 Official Wimbledon Championships website
 Draw for men and mixed, ITF
 Draw for women, ITF

 
Wimbledon Championships
Wimbledon Championships
June 1980 sports events in the United Kingdom
July 1980 sports events in the United Kingdom